Verticordia setacea is a flowering plant in the myrtle family, Myrtaceae and is endemic to the south-west of Western Australia. It is a shrub with small leaves and deep pink flowers with short styles in late spring.

Description

Flowering time is in November and December.

Taxonomy and naming
Verticordia setacea was first formally described by Alex George in 2010 from a specimen collected on private land near Lake Grace and the description was published in Nuytsia. The specific epithet (setacea) is derived from the Latin word seta meaning "bristle" referring to the bristly surface of some parts of the flowers of this species.

George placed this species in subgenus Verticordia, section Platandra along with V. gracilis.

Distribution and habitat
This verticordia lateritic soil or in sand over laterite. It occurs in the a small area near Lake Grace in the Mallee biogeographic region.

Conservation
Verticordia setacea is classified as "Priority Two" by the Western Australian Government Department of Parks and Wildlife, meaning that it is poorly known and known from only one or a few locations.

References

setacea
Rosids of Western Australia
Eudicots of Western Australia
Plants described in 2010